Andesiana lamellata is a moth of the Andesianidae family. It is known from Argentina (Neuquen and Rio Negro) and Chile (Malleco and Valdivia).

Adults are sexually dimorphic, with females being up to 1/3 larger than males. The vestiture of the male forewing is grey with a metallic sheen, covered by a reticulate pattern of reddish brown. The hindwings are grey with a diffuse reticulated brownish pattern, but lighter towards the wing base. Females have a less pronounced wing pattern.

Adults fly from late September to mid January, with isolated records in February and April in Nothofagus pumilio and Nothofagus antarctica forests.

External links
 Andesianidae, a new family of monotrysian moths (LepidopteraiAndesianoidea) from austral South America

Andesianidae
Andesianidae of South America
Fauna of the Andes
Moths of South America
Moths described in 1989